This is a list of Estonian television related events from 1979.

Events

Debuts

Television shows

Ending this year

Births
21 February - Maria Annus, actress 
21 April - Karin Rask, actress
3 May - Ingrid Isotamm, actress 
21 June - Ithaka Maria, singer and TV host
6 November - Gerli Padar, singer and TV host
21 December - Kristjan Sarv, actor

Deaths